John Howard Sinclair (May 27, 1848 – June 8, 1924) was a Canadian politician.

Born in Goshen, Guysborough, Nova Scotia, Sinclair was educated in the Common School of Goshen, Guysborough Academy and Dalhousie College, Halifax. A lawyer, he was Mayor of New Glasgow in 1890-91 and member of the Nova Scotia House of Assembly from 1894 to 1904. He was elected to the House of Commons of Canada for Guysborough in a 1904 by-election after the sitting MP, Duncan Cameron Fraser, was appointed a Judge of the Nova Scotia Supreme Court. A Liberal, he was re-elected in 1904, 1908, 1911, and 1917.

Electoral record

References
 The Canadian Parliament; biographical sketches and photo-engravures of the senators and members of the House of Commons of Canada. Being the tenth Parliament, elected November 3, 1904

External links
 

1848 births
1924 deaths
Liberal Party of Canada MPs
Mayors of places in Nova Scotia
Members of the House of Commons of Canada from Nova Scotia
Nova Scotia Liberal Party MLAs